Sriram is a Hindu god.

Sriram may also refer to:

Sriram Krishnan, investor
Sriram, stage name of Srikanth, Indian actor
Sriram Raghavan, Indian director
Sriram Chandra Bhanj Deo, Maharaja
Sriram Sagar Project, dam
Sriram Balaji, tennis player
Sriram Parthasarathy, musician

Indian masculine given names